Toehider are a progressive rock band from Melbourne, Australia. Their influences include progressive rock, pop, hard rock, metal and folk.

Toehider was founded in 2008 by Michael Mills. After the release of their debut EP Toe Hider in the same year, another twelve EPs were released from May 2009 to April 2010 as part of a 12in12 project, in which the release took place on the twelfth of each month for twelve consecutive months. During these recordings, the band experimented with different styles of music. The EPs were each provided with cover artwork and a 2-page comic by their graphic artist Andrew Saltmarsh.

In 2011 the debut album To Hide Her was released, and in 2012 an EP Children of the Sun Part 2. The band's second album What Kind of Creature Am I? was released in 2014. In 2015 the EP Mainly Songs About Robots was recorded with Vinny Appice on drums and released in September of the same year.

The album I LIKE IT! was released in 2020, consisting of selected songs from a list of demos voted by the fans to be recorded for the album.

Mastermind Michael Mills has guest-starred as a singer on the Ayreon albums The Theory of Everything, Transitus, and The Source, as well as on the live project The Universe.

References

Australian hard rock musical groups
Musical groups from Melbourne